Cyana torrida is a moth of the family Erebidae. It was described by William Jacob Holland in 1893. It is found in Equatorial Guinea.

References

Cyana
Moths described in 1893
Moths of Africa